Bill Jones (19 September 1897 – 11 July 1967) was an  Australian rules footballer who played with Geelong in the Victorian Football League (VFL).

Notes

External links 

1897 births
1967 deaths
Australian rules footballers from Victoria (Australia)
Geelong Football Club players